Han Hee-hoon (Hanja: 韓熙訓; born 10 August 1990) is a South Korean footballer who plays as a defender for Busan IPark.

Honors and awards

Player
Daegu FC
 Korean FA Cup Winners (1) : 2018

References

External links
 
 

1990 births
Living people
Association football defenders
South Korean footballers
South Korean expatriate footballers
Ehime FC players
Tochigi SC players
Bucheon FC 1995 players
Daegu FC players
Gwangju FC players
J2 League players
K League 2 players
K League 1 players
Expatriate footballers in Japan
South Korean expatriate sportspeople in Japan